The 1998 AFL draft consisted of a pre-season draft, a national draft, a trade period and a rookie elevation.  The AFL draft is the annual draft of talented players by Australian rules football teams that participate in the main competition of that sport, the Australian Football League.

In 1998 there were 91 picks to be drafted between 16 teams in the national draft. The Brisbane Lions received the first pick in the national draft after finishing on the bottom of the ladder during the 1998 AFL season.

1998 national draft
The national draft was held on 1 November 1998.

Trades

1999 pre-season draft

1999 rookie draft

Rookie elevation
This list details 1998-listed rookies who were elevated to the senior list; it does not list players taken as rookies in the rookie draft which occurred during the 1998/99 off-season.

See also 
 Official AFL Draft page

AFL Draft
Australian Football League draft